Harvik Desai (born 4 October 1999) is an Indian cricketer. He made his List A debut for Saurashtra in the 2016–17 Vijay Hazare Trophy on 26 February 2017.

In December 2017, he was named in India's squad for the 2018 Under-19 Cricket World Cup, and scored the winning runs for India in the final of the tournament. He made his first-class debut for Saurashtra in the 2018–19 Ranji Trophy on 1 November 2018. In January 2019, in the quarter-final match of the 2018–19 Ranji Trophy against Uttar Pradesh, Desai scored his maiden century in first-class cricket. He made his Twenty20 debut for Saurashtra in the 2018–19 Syed Mushtaq Ali Trophy on 21 February 2019.

References

External links
 

1999 births
Living people
Indian cricketers
Saurashtra cricketers
People from Bhavnagar